A Patient Man is a crime drama film, written and directed by Kevin Ward and released on January 17, 2020.

Plot
Tom Alexander works for a consulting firm in Los Angeles. He was injured and his wife killed in a car accident caused by another driver running a red light; he now wears a knee brace, commutes on his bicycle and via light rail instead of in a car, and is seeing a therapist. He is troubled by flashbacks; on the train, he meets Aaron, who tells him his driving license has been restricted, and Tom patiently finds out more and then plots his revenge.

Cast
Jonathan Mangum as Tom Alexander
Tate Ellington as Aaron Clarke
Kelsey Scott as Tom's therapist
Amir Talai as Rami, Tom's co-worker
Catherine Von Till as Rachel

Production
A Patient Man was Ward's first feature film; he also wrote the script, and described it as Hitchcockian in inspiration.

Release
The film was shown at the 2019 Austin Film Festival and released on video on demand on February 7, 2020.

Reception
Some reviewers described A Patient Man as "interesting and twisted" and praised Ward's direction for "an amazing job of hiding the clues to the mystery while showing a very real depiction of how a person can descend into revenge because of their grief", and Mangum's and Ellington's performances. Others criticized the film for "telegraph[ing] the plot even while spinning it" and Mangum's performance as "so deadpan as to be sleep inducing",

References

External links
 
 

2019 films
2019 crime films
2010s English-language films